The 1974 NAIA Division I football season was the 19th season of college football sponsored by the NAIA and the fifth season of the league's two-division structure.

The season was played from August to November 1974 and culminated in the 1974 NAIA Division I Champion Bowl, played on December 14, 1974 on the campus of Texas A&I University in Kingsville, Texas. Texas A&I defeated Elon in the Champion Bowl, 34–23, to win their third NAIA national title.

Conference realignment

Conferences changes
 This was the first season for the Oklahoma Intercollegiate Conference. The second conference to bear this name, it was formed by six former members of the Oklahoma Collegiate Conference, which disbanded after the prior season. All six initial members were public colleges from Oklahoma.
 This was the final season of football for the Carolinas Conference. Before the start of the following season, the league's five members would subsequently join the new, football-only South Atlantic Conference.

Membership changes

Conference standings

Postseason

See also
 1974 NAIA Division II football season
 1974 NCAA Division I football season
 1974 NCAA Division II football season
 1974 NCAA Division III football season

References

 
NAIA Football National Championship